Larry Shipp Jr. (born May 23, 1986) is a former American football wide receiver.

Professional career

Alabama Vipers
In 2009, Shipp signed to play with the Alabama Vipers of af2. After the season, the Viper announced that they would be a part of the new Arena Football League, and Shipp re-signed with the team for 2010.

Georgia Force
In 2011, the Vipers went through change again, as they replaced the former Georgia Force, taking over their identity and records. Shipp was re-signed by the team again, and had a highly successful season. He has re-signed with the Force for the 2012 season.

References

External links
 Larry Shipp - Georgia Force Bio

1986 births
Living people
Players of American football from Memphis, Tennessee
American football wide receivers
Tennessee Tech Golden Eagles football players
Detroit Lions players
Alabama Vipers players
Georgia Force players
Spokane Shock players
Alabama Hammers players